Left for Dead is a Canadian slasher film and the debut film for Mindscape Films, described by director Christopher Harrison as "an '80s slasher flick", similar to John Carpenter's Halloween series.

Cast
 Danielle Harris as Nancy Simmons
 Steve Byers as Tommy St. Clair
 Shawn Roberts as Clarke Seamus
 Boyd Banks as Mike Clara
 Daniel Clark as Kenny Radford
 Lenka Matuska as Amber Shane
 Rebecca Davis as Jenna
 Naomi Hewer as Faye
 Ahmed Dirani as Paolo
 Robbie Amell as Blair
 John Bregar as Ryan
 JaNae Armogan as Shelly
 Emily Riley as Kami
 Robert Wheeler as Tyler
 Jennifer Greer as Nancy
 Beckett Rider as Corey
 Sam Tiler as Police Officer
 Caila Mason as Police Officer
 Sofia Sweele as Paramedic
 Bradley Caball as Paramedic

Production
Left for Dead was filmed in Hamilton, Ontario in Canada.

Release
The film was released on 16 October 2009 in Germany and came out in North America in 2010.

References

External links
 

2007 films
English-language Canadian films
2007 horror films
2000s slasher films
Canadian supernatural horror films
Canadian slasher films
Supernatural slasher films
2000s English-language films
2000s Canadian films